A special election to determine the member of the United States House of Representatives for Georgia's 6th congressional district was held on February 23, 1999. The seat was previously held by Speaker of the House Newt Gingrich, who resigned after facing a revolt in the Republican caucus after the Republicans lost four seats in the 1998 midterm elections. Since Johnny Isakson received over 50% of the vote, no runoff was held. He would later be elected to the United States Senate.

Results

See also 
 1999 United States House of Representatives elections

References

Georgia 1999 06
Georgia 1999 06
1999 06 Special
Georgia 05 Special
United States House of Representatives 06 Special
United States House of Representatives 1999 06